Shekar is a 2022 Indian Telugu-language thriller film directed by Jeevitha Rajashekar. A remake of the Malayalam film Joseph (2018), the film stars Dr. Rajashekar and Athmiya Rajan, who reprises her role from the original. This film marks Jeevitha's return to direction after a break.

Plot

Cast 
Dr. Rajashekar as Shekar
Athmiya Rajan as Indu, wife of Shekar
 Muskaan Khubchandhani
 Shivani Rajashekar as Shekar's daughter
 Kishore as Mallikarjun
 Posani Krishna Murali
 Sameer
 Abhinav Gomatam
 Bharani Shankar
 Ravi Varma
 Shravan Raghavendra
 Prakash Raj as an advocate (cameo appearance)

Production 
The film was initially announced with newcomer Lalith as the director. The film is the first time Rajasekhar is in a film with both his wife Jeevitha and daughter Shivani.

Soundtrack

Release 
The film was scheduled to release on Sankranthi but was delayed and released on 20 May 2022.

Following the film's release, financer A. Parandhama Reddy approached the city civil court in Hyderabad, and petitioned that Jeevitha and Rajashekar have failed to repay the loan of 65 lakh. As the makers failed to repay payback the loan within the given deadline, the court halted the screening of film on 22 May 2022, attaching its world negative rights. Actor Rajasekhar responded through Twitter that "some people have conspired and stopped our film from screening." As of 24 May 2022, the court allowed the screening of the film.

Reception 
Prakash Pecheti of Telangana Today wrote that "Though Shekar does vary from the Malayalam  of making, the Telugu version is a stimulating drama. Jeevitha deftly steers the film to perfection by staying true to the original". Sangeetha Devi Dundoo of The Hindu opined that "Shekar is a detour from the norm for Telugu cinema and is an earnest attempt. If only it had more spark in the performances and better music". Thadhagath Pathi of The Times of India stated that "the film manages to hold its own despite a few tweaks, sticking to the soul of the original". A critic from 123telugu said that "On the whole, Shekar is an emotional thriller that has a decent premise and able performances. The storyline is good but the needed thrills and slow pace are slightly missing. If you ignore these factors, Shekar ends up a passable watch this weekend".

References

 Telugu remakes of Malayalam films
2022 films
2020s Telugu-language films
Indian thriller films
2022 thriller films